Sesamia is a genus of moths of the family Noctuidae erected by Achille Guenée in 1852.

Species

References

Hadeninae